CKCC-FM is a Canadian radio station, broadcasting at 100.7 FM in Campbell River, British Columbia. Licensed as a Type B community radio station, it broadcasts a country music format branded as The Raven 100.7.

Owned and operated by the Aupe Cultural Enhancement Society, the station broadcasts primarily in English but with some programming in Ayajuthem for the local Homalco First Nation.

The station was licensed by the CRTC in 2016, and officially launched in November 2019 after a few weeks of testing.

References

External links
 
 
 

Campbell River, British Columbia
KCC
KCC
Radio stations established in 2019
2019 establishments in British Columbia